Donald Edwin Vandevelde (born March 29, 1964), better known by his stage name Donnie Vie (and occasionally Don E. Vie), is an American musician, singer, and songwriter. He is best known as the main songwriter and lead vocalist of the rock band Enuff Z'Nuff.

Enuff Z'Nuff 
Their Atlantic Records debut spawned the hits "Fly High Michelle" and "New Thing", both of which charted on Billboard'''s Mainstream Rock chart. Over their 25-year career, Enuff Z'Nuff has produced a discography of 16 international releases and has played on Late Night with David Letterman. In May 2013, Vie left the band.

 Solo career (2003–present) 
Vie started his solo career in 2003 with the release of his album Just Enough!. His most recent studio album of new compositions is Beautiful Things which came out July 2019 in the U.S. with supporting music videos "Instant Karma" and "Beautiful Things". In October 2021, Vie released his new single "Party Time", along with a USB drive compilation of his solo material called The Donnie Vie Collection.

 Discography 
 Studio albums 
 Just Enough! (2003)
 Wrapped Around My Middle Finger (2012)
 The White Album (2014)
 Beautiful Things (2019) JPN - #230

 Compilations and EPs 
 This & That (2004)
 DVieD-EP (2006)
 Extra Strength (2007)
 Goodbye: Enough Z'Nuff (2014)
 The Best of Donnie Vie (2015)
 ! (2016)
 The Donnie Vie Collection (2021)

 With Enuff Z'Nuff 
 Enuff Z'Nuff (1989)
 Strength (1991)
 Animals with Human Intelligence (1993)
 1985 (1994)
 Tweaked (1995)
 Peach Fuzz (1996)
 Seven (1997)
 Paraphernalia (1999)
 10 (2000)
 Welcome to Blue Island (2003)
 ? (2004)
 Dissonance (2009)
 Clowns Lounge (2016)
 Brainwashed Generation (2020)
 Never Enuff: Rarities & Demos (2021)

 With V8 
 V8 Live in Europe 2015 (2015)

With Guilt N Shame 
 International Jaggoffs (2018)

References

External links
 
 
 

American male singers
American rock musicians
Living people
1964 births